A gubernatorial election was held on 17 April 1963 to elect the Governor of Hokkaido Prefecture.

Candidates
, age 57.
Kingo Machimura - incumbent governor of Hokkaido prefecture, age 62.
, age 52.
, age 60.

Results

References

Hokkaido gubernational elections
1963 elections in Japan